Rob Krier (born 1938 in Grevenmacher) is a Luxembourgian sculptor, architect, urban designer, and theorist. He is former professor of architecture at Vienna University of Technology, Austria.  From 1993 to mid-2010 he worked in partnership with architect Christoph Kohl in a joint office based in Berlin, Germany.

He is the older brother of fellow architect Léon Krier. Both are well-known representatives of New Urbanism and New Classical Architecture.

Career 

Krier studied architecture at the Technical University of Munich from 1959 to 1964.  After graduating, he worked with Oswald Mathias Ungers in Cologne and Berlin (1965–66) and Frei Otto in Berlin and Stuttgart (1967–70).  From 1973 to 1975, he was an assistant in the school of architecture at the University of Stuttgart.  In 1975, he was guest professor at the École polytechnique fédérale de Lausanne, in Switzerland.  From 1976 to 1998, he was professor of architecture at Vienna University of Technology. In addition, in 1996, he was a guest professor at Yale University, in the United States.

From 1976 to 1994, Krier had his own architect's office in Vienna.  From 1992 until 2004, he ran a joint office with Nicolas Lebunetel in Montpellier, France.  In 1993, he also founded a joint office with Christoph Kohl in Berlin. most recently incorporated as “Krier ∙ Kohl Gesellschaft von Architekten mbH”. Since June 2010, the renamed KK Gesellschaft von Architekten mbH has been backed by Rob Krier as senior advisor.

Krier first came to international attention with his 1975 book Stadtraum, which was translated into English under the title Urban Space in 1979, reprinted as Stadtraum / Urban Space in 2005 
 Krier contributed theoretically and practically to several key projects, including Ritterstrasse (1977–80) and Rauchstrasse (1980) in Berlin, Breitenfurterstrasse in Vienna (1981–87) and Kirchsteigfeld in Potsdam (1992–97).

Publications
Stadtraum in Theorie und Praxis (1975), Karl Krämer, Stuttgart. Translated into English, French, Italian, Spanish. English translation: Urban Space (1979), Academy Editions, London
Urban Projects 1968-1982 (1982), Rizzoli International
On Architecture (1982), Academy Editions, London
Architectural Composition (1988), Academy Editions
The Making of a Town. Potsdam - Kirchsteigfeld (1997), with Christoph Kohl, Papadakis Publishers
Town Spaces. Contemporary Interpretations in Traditional Urbanism (2003), Krier Kohl Architects, Basel/Berlin/Boston
Figures. A Pictorial Journal (2005), Papadakis Publisher, London
 Stadtraum / Urban Space(2005), Reprint of „Stadtraum in Theorie und Praxis“ (1975) / „Urban Space“ (1979), Umbau-Verlag Solingen
Cité Judiciaire Luxembourg 1991-2008 (2010), Edition Axel Menges, Stuttgart/London

Awards 

 Athena Medal from the Congress for the New Urbanism, 2009
 Driehaus Architecture Prize, 2022

References

Further reading
Kleefisch-Jobst, Ursula and Flagge, Ingeborg (Eds.): Rob Krier: A Romantic Rationalist; Architect and Urban Planner, Springer, 2005

External links 

 KK Urbanism ∙ Architecture ∙ Landscape
 Rob Krier - sculptor

Urban theorists
Living people
1938 births
People from Grevenmacher
Technical University of Munich alumni
Academic staff of the University of Stuttgart
Academic staff of TU Wien
New Classical architects
New Urbanism
21st-century Luxembourgian architects
Driehaus Architecture Prize winners